Manuel Martínez DeJesús (born October 3, 1970) is a Dominican Minor League Baseball manager and former professional baseball outfielder. He played during three seasons in Major League Baseball (MLB) for the Seattle Mariners, Philadelphia Phillies, Pittsburgh Pirates, and Montreal Expos. He also played three seasons in the Korea Baseball Organization (KBO) for the Samsung Lions and LG Twins. He is currently the manager of the DSL Mets1.

Playing career
Martínez was signed by the Oakland Athletics as an amateur free agent in 1988. Martinez played his first professional season with the Class A Short Season Southern Oregon A's in 1990. He played in MLB with the 1996 Mariners (nine games), the 1996 Phillies (13 games), the 1998 Pirates (73 games), and 1999 Expos (137 games). He played his last affiliated season in 2000 for the Florida Marlins' Triple-A affiliate, the Calgary Cannons. In parts of three seasons with four teams, Martínez appeared in 232 MLB games, batting .245 with eight home runs and 53 RBIs.

Martínez spent the 2001 through 2003 seasons playing in KBO in South Korea, where he appeared in 368 games while batting .277 with 57 home runs and 235 RBIs. He spent 2005 playing for the independent Long Island Ducks of the Atlantic League, appearing in 10 games and batting .282. He also played in the Mexican League from 2004 through 2008, and in the Dominican Winter League during the 2006–07 and 2007–08 seasons.

Post-playing career
Martínez spent several years in the New York Mets' organization as a coach, then became manager of the Dominican Summer League Mets 1 squad in 2015. , he still holds the role.

References

External links
, or Retrosheet

1970 births
Living people
Calgary Cannons players
Dominican Republic expatriate baseball players in Canada
Dominican Republic expatriate baseball players in Mexico
Dominican Republic expatriate baseball players in South Korea
Dominican Republic expatriate baseball players in the United States
Dorados de Chihuahua players
Iowa Cubs players
LG Twins players
Long Island Ducks players
Major League Baseball outfielders
Major League Baseball players from the Dominican Republic
Mexican League baseball outfielders
Minor league baseball coaches
Minor league baseball managers
Modesto A's players
Montreal Expos players
Nashville Sounds players
Olmecas de Tabasco players
Pericos de Puebla players
Philadelphia Phillies players
Pittsburgh Pirates players
Rojos del Águila de Veracruz players
Samsung Lions players
San Bernardino Spirit players
Seattle Mariners players
Scranton/Wilkes-Barre Red Barons players
Southern Oregon A's players
Tacoma Rainiers players
Tacoma Tigers players
Tigres de la Angelopolis players
Tigres del Licey players